Vladislav Anatolevich Kolyachonok (born 26 May 2001) is a Belarusian professional ice hockey defenseman currently playing for the Tucson Roadrunners in the American Hockey League (AHL) as a prospect to the Arizona Coyotes of the National Hockey League (NHL). He was drafted by the Florida Panthers, 52nd overall, in the 2019 NHL Entry Draft. He previously played for Dinamo Minsk of the Kontinental Hockey League, and made his NHL debut in 2022.

Playing career
Kolyachonok played as a youth in his native Belarus, with Team Belarus at the under-17 and under-18 level in the second tier Vysshaya Liga as an affiliate to top Belarusian club, HC Dinamo Minsk of the Kontinental Hockey League (KHL). His development was noticed in North America, as he was drafted 102nd overall by the London Knights of the 2018 CHL Import Draft.

In his first major junior season in North America, Kolyachonok appeared in 1 game with the London Knights to start the 2018–19 season, before he was claimed off waivers by the Flint Firebirds on 2 October 2018. Showing potential on the blueline with the Firebirds, Kolyachonok collected 4 goals and 29 points through 53 regular season games, and was later selected in the 2019 NHL Entry Draft in the second-round, 52nd overall, by the Florida Panthers.

Prior to the 2019–20 season, he was signed to a three-year, entry-level contract with the Panthers on 13 September 2019. Finishing second in scoring from the blueline in his final junior season, Kolyachonok posted 12 goals and 21 assists for 33 points.

With the pandemic delayed the beginning of the  season, Kolyachonok opted to remain in Belarus and was loaned by the Panthers to continue his development with HC Dinamo Minsk of the KHL. In making his professional debut, he contributed with 1 goal and 6 points through 46 regular season games before he was reassigned by the Panthers to AHL affiliate, the Syracuse Crunch, registering 2 assists through 10 games.

On 26 July 2020, Kolyachonok was traded by the Panthers, along with Anton Strålman and a second-round draft pick in 2024 to the Arizona Coyotes in exchange for a seventh-round selection in 2023. In the following  season, Koyachonok was initially reassigned by the Coyotes to AHL affiliate, the Tucson Roadrunners. Placing third in scoring from the blueline for the Roadrunners through the early stages of the season, Kolyachonok received his first recall to the NHL on 11 January 2022. The following day on 12 January, he made his NHL debut for the rebuilding Coyotes, in an upset 2–1 victory over the Toronto Maple Leafs. He appeared in 4 games with the Coyotes, before he was returned to the Tucson Roadrunners.

International play
Kolyachonok has played internationally at the junior and senior level for the Belarusian national team

Career statistics

Regular season and playoffs

International

Awards and honours

References

External links
 

2001 births
Living people
Arizona Coyotes players
Belarusian ice hockey centres
HC Dinamo Minsk players
Flint Firebirds players
Florida Panthers draft picks
London Knights players
Ice hockey people from Minsk
Syracuse Crunch players
Tucson Roadrunners players